Wojciech Gawroński (born March 25, 1953, in Nowy Sącz) is a former Polish slalom canoeist who competed in the 1970s. He won four medals at the ICF Canoe Slalom World Championships with two silvers (K-1 team: 1973, 1975) and two bronzes (K-1: 1973, K-1 team: 1977).

Gawroński also finished 23rd in the K-1 event at the 1972 Summer Olympics in Munich.

References

Sports-reference.com profile

1953 births
Canoeists at the 1972 Summer Olympics
Living people
Olympic canoeists of Poland
Polish male canoeists
Sportspeople from Nowy Sącz
Medalists at the ICF Canoe Slalom World Championships